The Uganda Electricity Generation Company Limited (UEGCL) is a parastatal company whose primary purpose is to generate electric power for use in Uganda and for sale to neighboring countries. As of December 2017, UEGCL's generation capacity was 380 megawatts, with that capacity planned to increase to over 1,300 megawatts, by 2023.

Location
The headquarters of UEGCL are on  Block C, Victoria Office Park, Plot 6-9 Okot Close, Bukoto, in Kampala, Uganda's capital and largest city. Its coordinates are 0°19'35.0"N, 32°34'38.0"E (Latitude:0.326389; Longitude:32.577222).

History
UEGCL was incorporated by the Uganda Ministry of Finance, Planning and Economic Development in 2001, following the break-up of the Uganda Electricity Board.

Operations
UEGCL is responsible for the operation, maintenance, and improvement of the power stations owned by the Ugandan government.

In 2002, UEGCL executed a 20-year operational, management, and maintenance concession to Eskom Uganda Limited, a subsidiary of South African energy company Eskom, to cover the two power stations UEGCL owned at the time: Kiira Power Station and Nalubaale Power Station. Eskom sells the electricity it generates to the Uganda Electricity Transmission Company Limited (UETCL) as the authorized single buyer. UETCL resells the power to Umeme, the energy distributor, which then sells it to the public.

As of 30 June 2020, UEGCL controlled 563 megawatts of the national installed generation capacity of 1,252 megawatts, accounting for about 45 percent. It is expected that when the 600 megawatts Karuma Power Station comes on board in the first half of 2021, UEGCL will control an estimated 1,163 MW out of 1,852 MW, accounting for about 62 percent at that time.

Planned initial public offering
In January 2015, the UEGCL chairman announced plans to list shares of company stock on the Uganda Securities Exchange in an initial public offering within the following two years. The funds raised would be used to develop more electricity generation stations, thus adding to national electricity output. At that time, UEGCL owned 380 megawatts of generating capacity, with a goal to increase to 563 megawatts in 2018 and 1,213 megawatts in 2020.

Power stations

Operational stations
 Nalubaale Hydroelectric Power Station: 180 megawatts
 Kiira Hydroelectric Power Station: 200 megawatts
 Isimba Hydroelectric Power Station: 183 megawatts
 Namanve Thermal Power Station: 50  megawatts

Power stations in development
 Karuma Power Station: 600 megawatts
 Ayago Power Station: 840 megawatts
 Nyagak III Power Station: 6.6 megawatts
 Muzizi Power Station: 48 megawatts

Governance
UEGCL is governed by a seven-person board of directors whose chairman is Proscovia Margaret Njuki. Other UEGCL board members include (a) Zachary Baguma Atwooki, (b) Ms. Hope Bizimana, (c) Paul Patrick Mwanja, (d) Nixon Kamukama and (e) Mark Martin Obia. The chief executive officer is Harrison E. Mutikanga. In August 2017, UEGCL received the ISO 9001: 2015 certification, becoming the first Ugandan government agency to receive this certification.

Corporate social responsibility
In December 2021, UEGCL launched a corporate social responsibility (CSR) project to extend grid electricity to over 40 villages in both Kayunga District and Kamuli District, as mitigation for "the increased pressure on local infrastructure, social services, and livelihoods arising from the construction of the.." Isimba Hydroelectric Power Station. The project is expected to last 24 months in Kayunga District and 36 months in Kamuli District. It will cost USh11 billion (approx. US$3.1 million).

See also

List of power stations in Uganda
Electricity Regulatory Authority
Energy in Uganda

References

External links
 UEGCL Homepage
 UEGCL ready for operation and maintenance of Karuma, Isimba
 Uganda: Electricity Firms Face Staffing Challenges
 UEGCL Strategic Plan & Direction 2015-2017

Energy companies of Uganda
Electric power infrastructure in Uganda
Electric power companies of Uganda
Government-owned companies of Uganda
Energy companies established in 2001
2001 establishments in Uganda